Zuqnin Monastery was an ancient Christian monastery located just to the north of Amida, near the modern-day city of Diyarbakır in eastern Turkey. John of Ephesus was ordained here by John of Tella in 529. It is at this monastery that the Zuqnin Chronicle was written by a West Syrian monk, probably Joshua the Stylite, in around 775, of which the monastery is most associated with. The library of the monastery was of considerable renown to scholars in the area, containing many valuable books, including the works of Eusebius, Socrates, John of Ephesus and the Chronicle of Zuqnin.

References

History of Diyarbakır Province
Ancient libraries
Syriac Orthodox monasteries in Turkey